Chronicle is a British television programme that was shown monthly and then fortnightly on BBC Two from 18 June 1966 until its last broadcast on 29 May 1991. Chronicle focused on popular archaeology and related subjects, and was considered an influential programme and a landmark in early television presentation of archaeology. The programme was commissioned by David Attenborough in 1966, and was produced by the Archaeological and Historical Unit headed by Paul Johnstone and later edited by Bruce Norman. Among the presenters of the programme were Magnus Magnusson, Colin Renfrew, David Drew, and John Julius Norwich.

Background

BBC first broadcast a regular archaeology programme on radio introduced by Glyn Daniel in 1946 titled The Archaeologist. This was followed by a popular television quiz show Animal, Vegetable, Mineral? from 1952, and Buried Treasure broadcast from 1954 to 1959. In 1966, the first controller of BBC Two, David Attenborough, thought that there was sufficient interest in archaeology and established a special unit on the subject, the Archaeological and Historical Unit, to produce Chronicle.  Attenborough intended Chronicle to report on archaeological digs and findings around the word where archaeology was shown as it was practised, and new discoveries could be presented on the show.  The Archaeological and Historical Unit at the BBC that produced the programme was headed by Paul Johnstone, later the show was edited by Bruce Norman. Norman described Chronicle as a "show" because they were "in the entertainment business – not the archaeology business", with the aim to "inform and educate the viewing public in as entertaining a way as possible". The show had many different writers, presenters and narrators, one of the earliest was Magnus Magnusson who wrote and presented the programme for a number of years from 1966 on. Other presenters included the archaeologists Glyn Daniel, Colin Renfrew, Mortimer Wheeler and David Drew, and the historian John Julius Norwich. The programme ended in 1991 after the death of its editor Bruce Norman.

The programme is a mix of full-length documentaries and some live broadcasts. It financed projects that they filmed and televised, the first of which was a live broadcast of an excavation on a prehistoric mound, Silbury Hill, undertaken by Richard Atkinson in 1968. However, this excavation as well as those at South Cadbury conducted by Leslie Alcock yielded few results. Later investigations funded include the post-mortem examination of Tutankhamun. Other notable episodes aired included the excavations at Knossos and Sutton Hoo, and it was part of the 16-hour live coverage of the raising of Mary Rose from the Solent. Most of the subjects were on ancient civilisations, with some on biographies, philosophy and various other aspects of archaeology such as industrial, underwater and amateur archaeology. The programmes were initially broadcast monthly. It became the primary outlet for archaeology documentaries on British television for many years, although later other documentaries were also produced, for example occasional series such as In Search of the Dark Ages by Michael Wood in 1981, and Romer's Egypt by John Romer in 1982, in particular the history-based Timewatch launched in 1982. A selection of excerpts and full programmes are available at the BBC archive website.

Reception

Critical
After a shaky start, the programme went on to produce a series of high quality documentaries and it was considered a high point of British documentary. However, it attracted some criticism for sensationalising some of the subjects, for example in the three episodes by Henry Lincoln on the Rennes-le-Château "mystery" and Knights Templar conspiracy theory broadcast in 1972, 1974, and 1979 (the conspiracy theory was further expounded in The Holy Blood and the Holy Grail and later became the inspiration for Dan Brown's novel The Da Vinci Code). It was also criticised for its "soft-centered approach" on such subjects as the Mary Rose. It was claimed that the dig at Silbury funded by the programme had damaged the site because it was not filled in properly after the dig.

Ratings
The show had good viewing figures for documentaries, rising from one million in 1973 to 2.5 million in 1983. Its most successful episodes were broadcast during the 16-hour coverage over three days of the raising of the Tudor warship Mary Rose in October 1982, which gained a cumulative audience of 20 million in the UK as well as other viewers in Europe.

Episodes
This is an incomplete list. The programme celebrated its 100th episode in 1974, and its 200th episode was broadcast in 1984.

1960s

1970s

1980s

1990s

References

Further reading
 Ray Sutcliffe (Editor), Chronicle: Essays From Ten Years of Television Archaeology (BBC Publishing, 1978).

External links

BBC Chronicle archive  (not available in all territories)

1966 British television series debuts
1991 British television series endings
1960s British documentary television series
1970s British documentary television series
1980s British documentary television series
1990s British documentary television series
BBC television documentaries
English-language television shows